Justin William Lemberg (born 23 August 1966) is an Australian former middle-distance swimmer of the 1980s, who won a bronze medal in the 400-metre freestyle, swimming at the 1984 Summer Olympics in Los Angeles.  He was coached by the flamboyant Laurie Lawrence.

Born and raised in Brisbane, Queensland, Lemberg put in the best performance of his life to improve his Australian record by more than two seconds to claim bronze, just 0.56 seconds behind the American duo of George DiCarlo and John Mykkanen.  He also competed in the 200-metre and 1500-metre freestyle events, but was eliminated in the heats.  He narrowly missed a second bronze, coming fourth as part of the 4x200-metre freestyle relay.

See also
 List of Olympic medalists in swimming (men)

References
 

1966 births
Living people
Australian male freestyle swimmers
Alabama Crimson Tide men's swimmers
Olympic bronze medalists in swimming
Olympic swimmers of Australia
People educated at Brisbane State High School
Swimmers from Brisbane
Swimmers at the 1984 Summer Olympics
Medalists at the 1984 Summer Olympics
Olympic bronze medalists for Australia
Universiade medalists in swimming
Universiade gold medalists for Australia
Medalists at the 1985 Summer Universiade
20th-century Australian people
21st-century Australian people